Blan is a commune in the Tarn department in southern France.

Notable people 

 Georges Polny, football player and manager

References

Communes of Tarn (department)